The Gladkoye peat railway is located in Leningrad Oblast, Russia. The railway operates year-round.

Current status 
The Gladkoye peat railway's first line was constructed in 1970, in the area of Tosnensky District, Leningrad Oblast from the village Gladkoye to the swamp peat fields. The peat railway was built for hauling milling peat and workers and operates year-round. In 2016, repairs are being made to the track.

Rolling stock

Locomotives 
TU8 – № 0073
ESU2A – № 411, 531, 883, 907, 1018

Railway cars 
 Flatcar
 Tank car
 Passenger car PV40
 Open wagon for peat TSV6A
 Hopper car to transport track ballast

Work trains 
Snowplow PSHS1 – № 168

See also
Narrow-gauge railways in Russia
Laryan narrow-gauge railway
Pelgorskoye peat railway

References and sources

External links

 Official Website 
 Photo - project «Steam Engine» 
 «The site of the railroad» S. Bolashenko 

750 mm gauge railways in Russia
Rail transport in Leningrad Oblast